Jim Shea may refer to:

 Jimmy Shea (born 1968), American skeleton racer
 Jim Shea, Sr. (born 1938), Nordic skier at the 1964 Winter Olympics
 Jim Shea (judge) (born 1966), Montana Supreme Court judge
 H. James Shea Jr. (1939–1970), Massachusetts state representative and anti-Vietnam War activist

See also
 James Shea (born 1991), English footballer